Torsti is both a given name and a surname. Notable people with the name include:

Torsti Lehtinen (born 1942), Finnish writer and philosopher
Torsti Verkkola (1909–1977), Finnish aircraft designer, researcher, and professor
Samu Torsti (born 1991), Finnish alpine skier

Finnish masculine given names
Finnish-language surnames